West Buckfastleigh is a small civil parish on the eastern border of Dartmoor in Devon, England. Situated within the parish are the village of Scorriton and the hamlets of Michelcombe and Combe.

Description
West Buckfastleigh is a civil parish located at the eastern fringes of Dartmoor, and lies inside of the borders of the National Park. The majority of the parish is farmland. The parallel valleys of the Holy Brook and the River Mardle run through the parish.

It is crossed by the ancient track known as Abbots' Way.

Location
Starting north and going with the clock, the neighbouring parishes are Holne, Ashburton, Buckfastleigh, Dean Prior and Dartmoor Forest. West Buckfastleigh lies within the local government district of South Hams, unlike the parish with which it shares the majority of its name, Buckfastleigh, which is in Teignbridge.

Notes

Dartmoor
Civil parishes in Devon